Enrique Villarreal (born 17 April 1947) is a Mexican boxer. He competed in the men's light heavyweight event at the 1968 Summer Olympics.

1968 Olympic results
Below are the results of Enrique Villareal, a Mexican light heavyweight boxer who competed at the 1968 Mexico City Olympics:

 Round of 32: bye
 Round of 16: lost to Fatai Ayinla (Nigeria) referee stopped contest

References

External links
 

1947 births
Living people
Mexican male boxers
Olympic boxers of Mexico
Boxers at the 1968 Summer Olympics
Sportspeople from Coahuila
Light-heavyweight boxers